Tobi 4 - Coptic Calendar - Tobi 6 

The fifth day of the Coptic month of Tobi, the fifth month of the Coptic year. On a common year, this day corresponds to December 31, of the Julian Calendar, and January 13, of the Gregorian Calendar. This day falls in the Coptic season of Peret, the season of emergence.

Commemorations

Saints 

 The martyrdom of Saint Eugenius the Soldier 
 The martyrdom of Saint Banikarous the Persian 
 The departure of Pope Theodosius II, the 79th Patriarch of the See of Saint Mark 
 The departure of Pope Matthew I, the 87th Patriarch of the See of Saint Mark

References 

Days of the Coptic calendar